Leo-Cedarville is a town in Cedar Creek Township, Allen County, Indiana, United States. The population was 3,603 at the 2010 census.

History
Once separate villages, Cedarville was platted in 1838, and Leo was founded in 1849, originally as the Town of Hamilton.

Leo-Cedarville was formed by the incorporation of the villages of Leo and Cedarville in 1996. This was done so that the two towns could not be annexed by the nearby city of Fort Wayne.

The Hursh Road Bridge was added to the National Register of Historic Places in 1981 and delisted in 1993.

Geography
Leo-Cedarville is located at  (41.214899, -85.015475) along the St. Joseph River and the Cedarville Reservoir.

Education
The town is served by East Allen County Schools: Cedarville Elementary School, Leo Elementary School, and Leo Junior/Senior High School.

Demographics

2010 census
As of the census of 2010, there were 3,603 people, 1,187 households, and 1,007 families living in the town. The racial makeup of the town was 97.1% White, 0.1% African American, 0.2% Native American, 0.8% Asian, 0.6% from other races, and 1.2% from two or more races. Hispanic or Latino of any race were 1.6% of the population.

There were 1,187 households, of which 48.4% had children under the age of 18 living with them, 73.3% were married couples living together, 7.1% had a female householder with no husband present, 4.5% had a male householder with no wife present, and 15.2% were non-families. 13.1% of all households were made up of individuals, and 5.7% had someone living alone who was 65 years of age or older. The average household size was 3.04 and the average family size was 3.32.

The median age in the town was 38.1 years. 32.3% of residents were under the age of 18; 7.1% were between the ages of 18 and 24; 24% were from 25 to 44; 27.2% were from 45 to 64; and 9.4% were 65 years of age or older. The gender makeup of the town was 49.8% male and 50.2% female.

2000 census
As of the census of 2000, there were 2,782 people, 922 households, and 778 families living in the town. The racial makeup of the town was 97.81% White, 0.07% African American, 0.29% Native American, 0.40% Asian, 0.29% from other races, and 1.15% from two or more races. Hispanic or Latino of any race were 1.04% of the population.

There were 922 households, out of which 47.3% had children under the age of 18 living with them, 76.2% were married couples living together, 5.7% had a female householder with no husband present, and 15.6% were non-families. 13.0% of all households were made up of individuals, and 5.5% had someone living alone who was 65 years of age or older. The average household size was 3.02 and the average family size was 3.33.

In the town, the population was spread out, with 32.9% under the age of 18, 6.2% from 18 to 24, 32.6% from 25 to 44, 19.9% from 45 to 64, and 8.4% who were 65 years of age or older. The median age was 34 years. For every 100 females, there were 98.0 males. For every 100 females age 18 and over, there were 98.5 males.

The median income for a household in the town was $66,652, and the median income for a family was $70,750. Males had a median income of $48,438 versus $25,552 for females. The per capita income for the town was $22,170. About 1.0% of families and 1.2% of the population were below the poverty line, including none of those under age 18 and 8.6% of those age 65 or over.

Government 

Leo-Cedarville's Town Clerk/Treasurer and Town Council members are elected to four-year terms. The Town Council has a total of 5 seats. The council includes the Council President and Vice President which are voted on within the council after an election. The current Town Clerk/Treasurer is Pamela Spannuth who was elected in 2016. The Town Manager is a non-council member and is appointed by a unanimous vote of the Town Council. The Town-Manager has the power to hire assistants, town maintenance workers, and other positions.

References

External links

 Town website

Towns in Allen County, Indiana
Towns in Indiana
Fort Wayne, IN Metropolitan Statistical Area
1996 establishments in Indiana